The 2019 Individual Long Track/Grasstrack World Championship is the 49th edition of the FIM speedway Individual Long Track World Championship.

Venues

Current Classification

References

External links
 Official FIM Retrieved 30 May 2019
 GrasstrackGB Retrieved 30 May 2019

2018
Speedway competitions in France
Speedway competitions in Germany
Speedway competitions in the Netherlands
Long
2019 in Dutch motorsport
2019 in German motorsport
2019 in French motorsport